Sue Bruce-Smith (1957/582 May 2020) was a British film producer. Variety described her as an "industry titan". She spent most of her career with Film4, and was serving as its deputy director at the time of her death. She specialised in financial and marketing strategy for distribution.

An influential producer, she is described by the industry as being encouraging but not imposing, and a key figure in the success of many British and independent films. She financed and/or produced multiple films for directors including Lenny Abrahamson, Danny Boyle, Sarah Gavron, Derek Jarman, Asif Kapadia, Yorgos Lanthimos, Mike Leigh, Steve McQueen, and Ben Wheatley. Among her over 100 films are several Academy Award winners, including 12 Years a Slave, The Favourite, Room, Slumdog Millionaire and Three Billboards Outside Ebbing, Missouri.

Early life
Bruce-Smith was born in Birmingham to Maureen (née Sinclair) and James Bruce-Smith. Her mother was a teacher and her father was a GP. She attended King Edward VI Camp Hill School for Girls, and then studied French at the University of Kent. In the late 1970s, she spent some time studying in Paris with future colleague Amanda Nevill. After graduating from Kent, she became a secondary school teacher. She also studied at Goldsmiths, University of London.

Career

1985–2004: Career beginnings and progression
In 1985, Bruce-Smith took a temporary job at Palace Pictures, which had begun producing films the year before, after taking a career break from teaching. She said that she was informally interviewed by Palace's founder Stephen Woolley and producer Paul Webster, explaining that they did not care about qualifications and she only revealed her education after being employed. She later spoke about misogyny in the company from its co-founder Nik Powell, saying that when she voiced opinions Powell would "react like [she] was a stupid woman hassling him over a fire drill. It was like swatting a fly for him", and that he would always come back to her later and admit she was right. Still, she said that she "was incredibly lucky to land at Palace [because] everyone was hugely inventive and questioning of the orthodoxy, which made it a dynamic and pretty anarchic environment, filled with highly creative people". She initially worked there, her introduction to the film industry, as a print and bookings manager, before moving up to marketing and distribution. In this role she worked on films including A Nightmare on Elm Street and Hairspray; she personally promoted A Nightmare on Elm Street by dressing up as Freddy Krueger on stage at the London Hippodrome. Bruce-Smith developed a passion for independent film at Palace.

In 1989, she joined the BFI's production department as its head of sales, staying until 1993 when she moved to the BBC and managed films' international distributions. Eventually, she joined Film4 for the first time in 1997. Working at Film4 in the late 1990s, Bruce-Smith put up funding for one of Werner Herzog's films, and was said to be amiable to his unusual requests. She left Film4 briefly in 2001 to pursue work with the independent production company Little Bird in Dublin, Ireland, but returned in 2004. She remained a board member of the Dublin International Film Festival until 2015.

2004–2020: Return to Film4 and acclaim
Film4 director Tessa Ross personally called Bruce-Smith to entice her back to the "recalibrated" Film4, and she became head of commercial development and distribution. She was said to be swayed back to Film4 because it would involve work in public service filmmaking, "which she was instinctively drawn to with its sense of remit and social purpose". In 2008, she was one of the co-founders of film sales company Protagonist Pictures as part of a Film4-Ingenious Media-Vertigo Films venture, marking Film4's move back into international distribution, something that Ross' rebrand had ended in 2002. Rose Garnett wrote in her obituary for The Guardian that Bruce-Smith spent "much of her long and influential tenure [at Film4 working] with Tessa Ross". Interviewed in 2014, Ross said that Bruce-Smith "comes to editorial meetings, she reads scripts early on, we talk about ideas, we often talk about directors and producers, and matching people up. She's very involved the minute we decide to move things into production – in conversations about scale and value, and how things should be built, she's unbelievably involved". Ross left Film4 in 2014.

In 2013, Bruce-Smith distributed Ben Wheatley's film A Field in England. It was reported as the first time that a film utilised complete simultaneous release, being released in cinemas, on home media, video on demand, and free to TV at the same time. Though the first film with all these releases happening on the same day, similar strategies with platform releases only days or weeks apart had been done before. Discussed in media scholar Virginia Crisp's book, Bruce-Smith suggested that changes in audience were driving the innovations in distribution. She said that Film4 had "wanted to do something like this for quite some time, to give the audience what they say they want: to be able to watch a new film when and where they want to"; she still described the practice as experimental and disruptive, supporting theatrical releases. Wheatley also gave his voice to the importance of the cinema, and to the importance of having financial backing from a channel if choosing to go down the simultaneous release route.

In the 2015/16 award season, Film4 (under director David Kosse) had 581 nominations from eleven films, most of which Bruce-Smith was involved with, including fifteen Academy Award and 22 BAFTA nominees; within these were three of the five Academy Best Actress nominees and eventual winner (Brie Larson for Lenny Abrahamson's Room). Bruce-Smith called the Oscar wins inspirational. Off the back of this success, Film4 was given a larger budget for 2016 from parent company Channel 4, allowing Bruce-Smith to set bolder aims in strategy. She signed the creators of The Inbetweeners for a four-film deal, and began working on more co-productions. Bruce-Smith was promoted to deputy director in 2017 by new director Daniel Battsek.

Production style and outreach
A mark of Bruce-Smith's work was creating strong relationships with up-and-coming directors, many of whom are "now considered to be among the very best", including Steve McQueen, Wheatley, Yorgos Lanthimos, and Sarah Gavron. Another is Abrahamson, who, when interviewed in anticipation of the 2015/16 award season in relation to Room, said that he goes to Film4 first with new projects: "they are supportive of the directors they work with, and there is no other agenda other than to help you make the film you want to make [...] the early stages of a project are when it is at its most delicate [...] it is so important that anybody you let into that part of the process is carefully chosen". Bruce-Smith concurred, saying that she liked to get involved from the start of a project, and always put the filmmaker first. Specialising in financial and marketing strategy for distribution, she would also guide production and leave her mark, but was committed to protecting a filmmaker's vision.

Bruce-Smith hosted the British industry's emerging female talent dinner in 2017, and is said to have gone out of her way to encourage both new and female talent in all aspects of the industry. In 2016, she spoke with Womanthology on diversity in the industry, saying that while female roles were on the rise there was still a lack of women writers, directors, and directors of photography. She also acknowledged "there is still a lot to be done to [...] keep diversity uppermost in our minds when taking the development decisions about which stories to focus on". In 2018, as deputy director of Film4, Bruce-Smith said that they had made use of Film London's Equal Access Network to hire people from more diverse backgrounds and, after Frances McDormand referenced the inclusion rider in her 2018 Academy Best Actress speech (for the Bruce-Smith backed Three Billboards Outside Ebbing, Missouri), explained the concept of the inclusion rider and said that McDormand was "throwing down the gauntlet to the industry" with her public mention.

Personal life and death
She married Irish celebrity chef and journalist Hugo Arnold in 1992, and they had two children. The couple owned houses in Dublin and Tuscany, Italy, and would often have friends staying at both. Bruce-Smith was diagnosed with cancer in 2018, described as "long and hard" but which she faced with good humour. McQueen dedicated the premiere of their fourth film together, Widows, to her after the diagnosis. She died at home in Dublin on 2 May 2020, at the age of 62.

Legacy
Bruce-Smith was well loved and respected in the industry, with Nick James saying that in January 2019, when she walked into a BAFTA screening theatre for an event in tribute to her, he "experienced such a joyous, instant explosion of applause" as he never had witnessed before. She received a special BAFTA in 2019 for Outstanding Contribution to Cinema. On receiving the special BAFTA, Bruce-Smith said: "I am very grateful to Bafta for this award and for prompting me to encourage all women out there not to limit themselves. Be properly ambitious and confident in your own ability to see that ambition realised."

Mike Downey, deputy chairman of the European Film Academy, wrote after her death that "Bruce-Smith's contribution to British, European and world cinema was immeasurable", and Pippa Harris, the chair of BAFTA, said that "her contribution to the UK film industry, and especially to Film Four and to independent film-making was immense". She was a passionate advocate for independent film, and was a member of the events committee of the British Independent Film Awards. Garnett lauds that Bruce-Smith "was pivotal in ushering [the] work [of] Steve McQueen, Andrea Arnold, Jon Glazer and Yorgos Lanthimos [...] through to audience and acclaim. She was central to the success of Mrs Brown, Slumdog Millionaire, Three Billboards Outside Ebbing, Missouri, Room, The Last King of Scotland, This Is England, You Were Never Really Here, Amy, and, most recently, the Oscar-winner The Favourite".

Mexican news outlet 24 horas noted that the news of Bruce-Smith's death had been reported all around the world, in recognition of "her legacy in the seventh art" (film), and James wrote in his tribute that appraisal of Bruce-Smith was "not only a reminder that the creative and financial elements of film are inextricably connected but also an admonition to auteurist magazines like this one [Sight & Sound] not to ignore or sideline such figures so much in future".

Filmography
As development coordinator, marketing-distribution, or company executive unless noted.

References

External links

1950s births
2020 deaths
BAFTA winners (people)
British women film producers
People from Birmingham, West Midlands
People educated at King Edward VI Camp Hill School for Girls
Alumni of the University of Kent
Alumni of Goldsmiths, University of London